As of May 2018, Azerbaijan Airlines serves the following destinations:

List

References

External links
Azerbaijan Airlines Timetable
Lists of airline destinations